Charles Quinn Priester (born September 16, 2000) is an American professional baseball pitcher in the Pittsburgh Pirates organization.

Amateur career
Priester attended Cary-Grove High School in Cary, Illinois. He played baseball and football, and was a member of the 2018 Cary-Grove football team that won the 6A state championship. He also caught a touchdown pass in the championship game. In 2019, as a senior, he went 8-2 with a 1.00 ERA, striking out 91 batters in  innings and was named the Illinois Gatorade Baseball Player of the Year. He committed to play college baseball at Texas Christian University.

Professional career
Priester was selected by the Pittsburgh Pirates with the 18th overall selection in the 2019 Major League Baseball draft. He signed with the Pirates on June 10 for $3.4 million. After signing, he was assigned to the Gulf Coast League Pirates. Over nine games (eight starts) in the GCL, he went 1-1 with a 3.19 ERA, striking out 41 over  innings. He did not play a minor league game in 2020 due to the cancellation of the season.

Priester spent the 2021 season with the Greensboro Grasshoppers with whom he went 7-4 with a 3.04 ERA and 98 strikeouts over  innings. In June, he was selected to play in the All-Star Futures Game.

References

External links

Living people
2000 births
Sportspeople from DuPage County, Illinois
Baseball players from Illinois
Baseball pitchers
 Gulf Coast Pirates players
West Virginia Black Bears players
Greensboro Grasshoppers players